The 2018 Espirito Santo Trophy took place 29 August – 1 September at Carton House Golf Club on its Montgomerie and O'Meara courses in Maynooth, County Kildare, Ireland. 

It was the 28th women's golf World Amateur Team Championship for the Espirito Santo Trophy.

The tournament was a 72-hole stroke play team event. There were a record 57 team entries, each with two or three players. One nation, Lebanon, made its first appearance.

Each team played two rounds at the Montgomerie Course and two rounds at the O'Meara Course in different orders. The top 27 teams on the final leaderboard, except Norway and France, all played the fourth round at the O'Meara Course. The best two scores for each round counted towards the team total.

The United States team won the Trophy for their 14th title and first win in 20 years, beating team Japan by 10 strokes. Japan earned the silver medal while the defending champions South Korea team took the bronze on third place one more stroke back.

The individual title went to Cho Ayean, South Korea, whose score of 17-under-par, 273, was two strokes ahead of Jennifer Kupcho, United States, and Yuka Yasuda, Japan.

Teams 
59 teams entered the event and completed the competition. Each team, except one, had three players. The team representing Lithuania had only two players.

Results 

Source:

Individual leaders 
There was no official recognition for the lowest individual scores.

References

External link
World Amateur Team Championships on International Golf Federation website

Espirito Santo Trophy
Golf tournaments in the Republic of Ireland
Golf in County Kildare
Eisenhower Trophy
Eisenhower Trophy
Eisenhower Trophy